Laurențiu is a Romanian masculine given name of Latin origin. It is used in Romania. The name was derived from the Roman surname Laurentius, which meant "from Laurentum". Laurentum was an ancient Roman city of Latium situated between Ostia and Lavinium, on the west coast of the Italian peninsula southwest of Rome.

Notable people with this name include:
Laurențiu Constantin, rugby player
Laurențiu Fulga, author
Laurențiu Profeta, composer
Laurențiu Rebega, politician
Laurențiu Reghecampf, footballer
Laurențiu Streza, metropolitan bishop
Laurențiu Țigăeru Roșca, politician

Romanian masculine given names